is the mayor of Hamamatsu, Shizuoka in Japan. A 1980 graduate of Keio University, he was first elected mayor in 2007 after serving in the House of Representatives in Diet (national legislature) for two terms.

References

External links 
 Official website 

1957 births
Living people
People from Hamamatsu
Keio University alumni
Members of the House of Representatives (Japan)
Mayors of places in Shizuoka Prefecture
21st-century Japanese politicians